Fort-de-France Bay is a large inlet of the Caribbean Sea, off the coast of Martinique. It is named after Martinique's capital, Fort-de-France, the chief town on the bay.

Important Bird Area
A tract of some 3,361 ha, encompassing the largest area of mangroves in Martinique, on the eastern side of the bay, has been recognised as an Important Bird Area (IBA) by BirdLife International because it supports populations of green-throated and purple-throated caribs, Antillean crested hummingbirds, Caribbean elaenias, Lesser Antillean flycatchers, Lesser Antillean pewees, scaly-breasted thrashers, Martinique orioles, Lesser Antillean saltators and Lesser Antillean bullfinches.

References

Bodies of water of Martinique
Important Bird Areas of Martinique
Inlets of North America